Bogole is a village and a Mandal in Nellore district in the state of Andhra Pradesh in India. It forms a part of Nellore Urban Development Authority.

References 

Villages in Nellore district